Jeongwang Station is a station on Seoul Subway Line 4 located in the Jeongwang-dong area of Siheung, South Korea. Its secondary station name is Tech Univ. of Korea. The name of the station originated from the local name.

This station has a significantly higher ridership compared to neighboring Oido Station. There are many restaurants and shops located close to the station including a large E-Mart.

Station layout

Ridership

References

Seoul Metropolitan Subway stations
Railway stations opened in 2000
Metro stations in Siheung